Dongtiejiangying Subdistrict is a subdistrict on the eastern end of Fengtai District, Beijing, China. It borders Yongdingmenwai Subdistrict and Fangzhuang Township to the north, Nanyuan and Xiaohongmen Townships to the east, Nanyuan Township and Dahongmen Subdistrict to the south, Xiluoyuan and Yongdingmenwai Subdistricts to the west. It has a census population of 152,873 as of 2020.

The name Dongtiejiangying is derived from its past status as one of the six blacksmith barracks during the Ming and Qing dynasty.

History

Administrative Division 
At the end of 2021, Dongtiejiangying Subdistrict is divided into 19 subdivisions, with 18 communities and 1 villages:

See also 

 List of township-level divisions of Beijing

References 

Fengtai District
Subdistricts of Beijing